Reginald Evelyn Peter Southouse-Cheyney (22 February 1896 – 26 June 1951) was a British crime fiction writer who flourished between 1936 and 1951. Cheyney is perhaps best known for his short stories and novels about agent/detective Lemmy Caution, which, starting in 1953, were adapted into a series of French movies, all starring Eddie Constantine (however, the best known of these – the 1965 science fiction film Alphaville – was not directly based on a Cheyney novel). Another popular creation was the private detective Slim Callaghan who also appeared in a series of novels and subsequent film adaptations.

Although out of print for many years, Cheyney's novels have never been difficult to find second-hand. Several of them have recently been made available as e-books.

Early life
Peter Cheyney was born in Whitechapel 1896, the youngest of five children, and educated at the Mercers' School in the City of London. He began to write skits for the theatre as a teenager, but this ended when the First World War  began. In 1915 he enlisted in the British Army as a volunteer, in 1916 was wounded on active service and published two volumes of poetry, Poems of Love and War and To Corona and Other Poems. The next year, 1917, his military service ended.

Starting in the late 1920s, Cheyney worked for the Metropolitan Police as a police reporter and crime investigator. Until he became successful as a crime novelist, he was often quite poor. It is said that he got his start through a bet; when Cheyney remarked that anyone could write a book in the idiom of the American thriller, he was wagered five pounds that he could not. Cheyney sold his first story as the result of this bet.

Career and characters
Cheyney wrote his first novel, the Lemmy Caution thriller This Man Is Dangerous in 1936 and followed it with the first Slim Callaghan novel, The Urgent Hangman in 1938. The immediate success of these two novels assured him of a flourishing new career, and Cheyney abandoned his work as a freelance investigator. Sales were brisk; in 1946 alone, 1,524,785 copies of his books were sold worldwide.

A meticulous researcher, he kept a massive set of files on criminal activity in London, but these  were destroyed during the Blitz in 1941; he however, soon began to replace his collection of clippings. He dictated his work. Typically he would "act out" his stories for his secretary, Miss Sprauge, who would copy them down in shorthand and type them up later.

The Caution books read very much like what they are: pulp stories written in ersatz American by a British writer. With the private detective Slim Callaghan however, he invented a non-American who is based in Cheyney's home territory of London.

Callaghan in the first book works from Chancery Lane in a Marlowe-type shabby office and he has difficulty paying the bills. However, unlike Marlowe, Callaghan is ambitious and after a success helping a rich female client, he is able to make the step up to having his own agency, with a fancy office and pretty secretary, in swanky Berkeley Square.

Subsequent novels in the series follow very much the tried and tested pattern. Callaghan's services are sought by rich and attractive female client. The Lady in question is, of course naturally involved in some upsetting business (often blackmail) that precludes going to police. Callaghan meets the lady, likes what he sees (Cheyney appears to have studied women's fashion for he never fails to describe in detail every lady's clothes and jewellery), is nonchalant and impudent, which simultaneously both upsets and attracts lady. The Lady of course is either afraid to tell all facts or is being deliberately misleading and Callaghan must work out truth for himself.

Callaghan begins his investigating, in Marlowe-style, by putting himself about and stirring up trouble, which attracts the attention of a number of people (including at least one shady nightclub owner) involved in the puzzle who supply him with enough pieces to get the whole picture and to plan strategy.

During these cases (usually over a period of days) Callaghan will push himself to the limit. He will get no sleep, drink continually ('three fingers of straight whisky'), and drive his Jaguar long distances (to Torquay or Weymouth to visit refined clients, and then back to London all in the same night) as part of his overall plan.

At the same time, he will meet a string of attractive women who will, of course, throw themselves at him during the story--but he however only has eyes for his refined client--hand out and receive beatings, tamper with evidence, and outsmart both criminals and the police until the case is solved and his refined client is extricated from trouble and danger. Only then (to the chagrin of his secretary, who has a long-standing crush) will he reap the dual reward of favours from the refined client, accompanied by a substantial cheque.

Cheyney's "Dark" series was widely praised during World War II for bringing more realism to espionage fiction. In their casual brutality and general "grubbiness," the "Dark" novels seem to have foreshadowed much of the Cold War fiction of the mid to late 1960s. Anthony Boucher placed these later works in the context of Graham Greene and Joseph Conrad.

The characterisation of Ernest Guelvada in the "Dark" series is one of the high points of Cheyney's career. A cheerfully sadistic war operative whose objective is to deplete the ranks of opposing forces in a leisurely but thorough fashion, the loquacious Guelvada still finds the time to dress immaculately, drink immoderate amounts of alcohol and remain a counter agent.

Cheyney published one volume of short stories, advice to critics and a few poems in No Ordinary Cheyney (London: Faber and Faber, 1948).

Cheyney makes a cameo appearance in the Dennis Wheatley/J.G. Links "dossier" mystery "Herewith the Clues," published in 1939. He appears as man-of-fortune William Benson, one of the suspects.

He died at age 55, after having fallen into a coma. He was buried at Putney Vale Cemetery in London.

Personal life
From all accounts, Cheyney lived much like his characters, working too hard, living the fast and careless life with a breathtaking abandon that eventually caught up with him. In addition to his literary skills, "he was a fencer of repute, a golfer, a crack pistol-shot, and a jiu-jitsu expert."

He joined the New Party (set up by Sir Oswald Mosley and precursor to the later British Union of Fascists or BUF) in 1931, heading its youth detachment, which protected public meetings.

He was married three times: in 1919 to the stage actress Dorma Leigh (from whom he was divorced in 1931), in 1934 to Kathleen Nora Walter Taberer, and in 1948 to Lauretta Theresa Singer. He had no children.

List of works

Lemmy Caution
This Man Is Dangerous (1936) – filmed as This Man Is Dangerous (France; Jean Sacha, 1953)
Poison Ivy (1937) – filmed as La môme vert-de-gris (France; Bernard Borderie, 1953)
Dames Don't Care (1937) – filmed as The Women Couldn't Care Less (France; Bernard Borderie, 1954)
Can Ladies Kill? (1938)
Don't Get Me Wrong (1939) – filmed as Vous pigez (France; Victor Trivas and Jacques Doniol-Valcroze, 1955)
You'd Be Surprised (1940)
Your Deal, My Lovely (1941) – filmed as Your Turn, Darling (France; Bernard Borderie (1963)
Never a Dull Moment (1942)
You Can Always Duck (1943)
I'll Say She Does! (1945) – filmed as Women Are Like That (France; Bernard Borderie, 1960)
G-Man at the Yard (1946)

Slim Callaghan
The Urgent Hangman (1938)  – filmed as Meet Mr. Callaghan (UK; Charles Saunders, 1954)
Dangerous Curves (1939), US title: Callaghan
You Can't Keep the Change (1940)
It Couldn't Matter Less (1941), US title: Set-up for Murder  – filmed as More Whiskey for Callaghan (France; Willy Rozier, 1955)
Sorry You've Been Troubled (1942), US title:  Farewell to the Admiral  - filmed as Your Turn, Callaghan (France; Willy Rozier, 1955)
They Never Say When (1944)
Uneasy Terms (1946) – filmed under the same title in 1948
Calling Mr. Callaghan (1953) –  collected short stories

Dark Series
A loose series grouping together several different protagonists:
Dark Duet (1942), also as The Counterspy Murders
The Stars Are Dark (1943), also as The London Spy Murders
The Dark Street (1944), also as The Dark Street Murders
Sinister Errand (1945), also as Sinister Murders  – filmed as Diplomatic Courier (US; Henry Hathaway, 1952)
Dark Hero (1946), also as The Case of the Dark Hero
Dark Interlude (1947), also as The Terrible Night
Dark Wanton (1948), also as Case of the Dark Wanton
You Can Call It a Day (1949), also as The Man Nobody Saw
Dark Bahama (1950), also as I'll Bring Her Back
Lady, Behave! (1950), also as Lady Beware
Ladies Won't Wait (1951), also as Cocktails and the Killer

Other novels
Another Little Drink (1940), also as Premeditated Murder and A Trap for Bellamy
Night Club (1945), also as Dressed to Kill
Dance Without Music (1947). Serialised, News of the World.
Try Anything Twice (1948), also as Undressed to Kill
One of Those Things (1949), also as Mistress Murder

Short story collections
You Can't Hit a Woman (1937)
Knave Takes Queen (1939; enlarged edition, 1950)
Mr. Caution – Mr. Callaghan (1941)
Making Crime Pay (1944), collected stories, articles, radio plays
The Curiosity of Etienne MacGregor (1947), also as The Sweetheart of the Razors
No Ordinary Cheyney (1948)
Velvet Johnnie (1952)
The Adventures of Julia (1954), US title: The Killing Game
He Walked in Her Sleep (1954), also as MacTavish
The Mystery Blues (1954), also as Fast Work

Uncollected short fiction
The Snow Lady. Morecambe Guardian, 21 March 1930 (Alonso Mactavish)
The Snow Man. Hastings & St Leonards Observer, 27 December 1930 (Alonso Mactavish)
Angel Unawares. Sheffield Daily Independent Christmas Budget, 19 December 1936
Bread upon the Waters. Rugby Advertiser, 18 February 1938

Uncollected non-fiction
Curse of the Crystal. Belfast Telegraph, 1 January 1931
Suicide Walkers - Are You One?. Sunderland Daily Echo & Shipping Gazette, 14 July 1937

Biographies and memoirs
A 1954 biography of Cheyney, Peter Cheyney: Prince of Hokum, was written by Michael Harrison. (London: N. Spearman, 1954.)

Cheyney published a semi-autobiographical volume, Making Crime Pay and after his death at least two biographical essays appeared in posthumous collections. An essay by Viola Garvin, "Peter Cheyney" appears in Velvet Johnnie a posthumous collection of Cheyney's short stories (London: Collins, 1952, pages 7–32). The other essay is anonymous. It appears in the Cheyney collection Calling Mr. Callaghan (London: Todd, 1953, pages 7–16).

References

External links
 
 Complete Bibliography: British editions, international editions, short stories & magazine publications 
 
 Biography and bibliography of Peter Cheyney from thrillingdetective.com
 Peter Cheyney Collection at the Harry Ransom Center at the University of Texas at Austin

1896 births
1951 deaths
20th-century English novelists
People educated at Mercers' School
Burials at Putney Vale Cemetery
English crime fiction writers
English male novelists
20th-century English male writers
British Army personnel of World War I